Immaculate Conception Seminary may refer to:

 Seminary of the Immaculate Conception, in Huntington, New York
 Immaculate Conception Seminary School of Theology, in South Orange, New Jersey, part of Seton Hall University